Charley's Aunt is a 1956 West German comedy film directed by Hans Quest and starring Heinz Rühmann, Hertha Feiler and Claus Biederstaedt. It is an adaptation of the 1892 British play Charley's Aunt by Brandon Thomas.

It was made at the Spandau and Tempelhof Studios in Berlin. The film's sets were designed by the art directors Hans Kuhnert and Peter Schlewski. It was shot in Eastmancolor.

Plot 
Commercial Attaché Dr. Otto Dernburg came to Germany from South America for business negotiations. His eye falls on the attractive millionaire Carlotta Ramirez. But first he visits his younger brother Ralf, who lives in an attic apartment with his friend Charley. The two are expecting the attractive Swedes Ulla and Britta, but are afraid of their strict uncle Niels. Charley's unknown aunt, who also wanted to come, apologized at short notice. But Britta and Ulla don't want to stay alone with the two men.

For the sake of his brother and to save the evening, Dr. Dernburg as Charley's aunt. The situation becomes increasingly complicated when Charley's father and uncle Niels show up. However, the fake aunt manages to placate both of them. Finally, the real aunt appears, who is none other than Carlotta Ramirez. At first she is very piqued because the wrong aunt is wearing the dress that Dernburg's butler had stolen shortly before. She embarrasses the fake aunt, but doesn't let her get caught. Only when the women have left does Dr. Dernburg. The next day, Carlotta shows herself in the dress Dernburg wore the night before. She shows him that she saw through him, but doesn't hold grudges against him.

Cast
 Heinz Rühmann as Doctor Otto Dernburg
 Hertha Feiler as Carlotta Ramirez
 Claus Biederstaedt as Ralf Dernburg
 Walter Giller as Charley Sallmann
 Ruth Stephan as Mona
 Bum Krüger as Peter
 Hans Olden as Wolke
 Ina Peters as Britta Nielsen
 Elisa Loti as Ulla Bergström
 Hans Leibelt as Niels Bergström
 Paul Hörbiger as August Sallmann
 Helmuth Rudolph as Consul general
 Hilde von Stolz as Consul general's wife
 Wolfgang Neuss as Head porter
 Ewald Wenck as Hotel concierge
 Wolfgang Condrus as bell boy
 Wulf Rittscher as Night club owner
 Wolfgang Völz as Police man

References

Bibliography
 Bock, Hans-Michael & Bergfelder, Tim. The Concise CineGraph. Encyclopedia of German Cinema. Berghahn Books, 2009.

External links
 

1956 films
West German films
1956 comedy films
German comedy films
1950s German-language films
Films directed by Hans Quest
Films based on Charley's Aunt
Films shot at Spandau Studios
Films shot at Tempelhof Studios
Films shot in Berlin
Constantin Film films
1950s German films